Motyl may refer to:
 Poznań Aviation Circle Motyl, a Polish sailplane

Places 
 Motyl, Kuyavian-Pomeranian Voivodeship, a village in Poland
 Motyl, Łódź Voivodeship, a village in Poland

People 
 Alexander J. Motyl (born 1953), American historian
 Vladimir Motyl (1927–2010), Belarusian film director

See also